Dennis Bührer (born 13 March 1983 in Emmendingen) is a German former professional footballer who played as a midfielder. He works as a manager for Bahlinger SC.

References

External links
 

1983 births
Living people
People from Emmendingen
Sportspeople from Freiburg (region)
German footballers
Footballers from Baden-Württemberg
Association football midfielders
Germany youth international footballers
2. Bundesliga players
3. Liga players
SC Freiburg players
Sportfreunde Siegen players
Rot-Weiss Essen players
Dynamo Dresden players
Bahlinger SC players
German football managers